"You're All The World to Me" is an American song written in 1950 by composer Burton Lane and lyricist Alan Jay Lerner for the 1951 MGM musical, Royal Wedding. The lyrics by Lerner, who also wrote the story and screenplay, give song-and-dance man Tom Bowen, played by Fred Astaire, the opportunity to proclaim his love for Anne Ashmond (Sarah Churchill) while dancing on the walls and ceiling of a custom-made set which, along with an attached camera and camera operator, rolled on an axis to provide the anti-gravity illusion.

The music to the song was used again in 1953 for the title credits and dance routine that opened MGM's Torch Song, which starred Joan Crawford.

Song also recorded by 
Tony Bennett
Matthew Morrison and Jayma Mays as their characters Will Schuester and Emma Pillsbury, respectively, on the fourth season of the American TV series Glee. It is featured in the episode "Girls (and Boys) On Film", where Will dances on the walls and ceiling.

Notes and references

External links

Fred Astaire songs
1950 songs
Songs with lyrics by Alan Jay Lerner
Songs with music by Burton Lane